is a city in Toyama Prefecture, Japan. , the city had an estimated population of 30,328 in 10,331 households. and a population density of 230 persons per km².

Geography
Oyabe is in the Tonami flatlands of far western Toyama Prefecture, and is bordered by Ishikawa Prefecture to the west. Much of the area is a dispersed settlement typical of this region of Japan. Oyabe has a humid continental climate (Köppen Cfa) characterized by mild summers and cold winters with heavy snowfall.  The average annual temperature in Oyabe is 14.0 °C. The average annual rainfall is 2454 mm with September as the wettest month. The temperatures are highest on average in August, at around 26.7 °C, and lowest in January, at around 2.7 °C.

Surrounding municipalities
Toyama Prefecture
 Tonami
 Nanto
 Takaoka
Ishikawa Prefecture
 Kanazawa
 Tsubata

Demographics
Per Japanese census data, the population of Oyabe has declined in recent decades.

History
The area of present-day Oyabe was part of ancient Etchū Province and developed as a post station on the Hokuriku kaidō highway during the Edo period. The town of Isurugi was created with the establishment of the municipalities system on April 1, 1889. It was raised to city status upon merging with the town of Tochu on August 1, 1962, and was renamed Oyabe.

Government
Oyabe has a mayor-council form of government with a directly elected mayor and a unicameral city legislature of 1６ members.

Education
Oyabe has five public elementary schools and four public junior high schools operated by the town government, and three public high schools operated by the Toyama Prefectural Board of Education.

Transportation

Railway
 Ainokaze Toyama Railway

Highway
Hokuriku Expressway

Local attractions
Oyabe Yotaka - adapted from a traditional field festival, it is held on the nights of 10 and 11 June. The festival is 400 years old and has been passed down from generation to generation in 84 different locations in Oyabe. 
Helicopter and Disaster Prevention Festival, held from 26–27 August
Calamus Festival (Flower Festival), held on 18 June
Mitsui Outlet Park, Hokuriku Oyabe

Notable people from Oyabe
Toshio Yamada, politician
Hiroshi Hase, Japan's Minister of Education, Culture, Sports, Science and Technology

External links

  
 Official Oyabe Festival website

References

 
Cities in Toyama Prefecture